The Nursery Inn is a pub at 258 Green Lane, Heaton Norris, Stockport, Greater Manchester, England.

It was CAMRA's National Pub of the Year for 2001.

It is run by Hydes Brewery.

References

External links

Grade II listed pubs in Greater Manchester
Grade II listed buildings in the Metropolitan Borough  of Stockport